Crystal Island may refer to:

 Crystal Island (building project), a future building project in Moscow, Russia
Crystal Island: Uncharted Discovery, an educational video game
Crystal Island: Lost Investigation, an educational video game made by the same group as the first
 Crystal Island (Ontario), an island in the Detroit river